Old Dominion is an unincorporated community in Albemarle County, Virginia, United States.  Its elevation is 535 feet (163 m).

References

Unincorporated communities in Virginia
Unincorporated communities in Albemarle County, Virginia